James Stewart Holden (21 April 1942 in Grange Moor, Huddersfield – 2004) was a professional footballer who played for Huddersfield Town, Oldham Athletic, Rochdale and Wigan Athletic.

Holden appeared in 6 Cheshire League games for Wigan.

References

1942 births
2004 deaths
Footballers from Huddersfield
English footballers
Association football defenders
English Football League players
Huddersfield Town A.F.C. players
Oldham Athletic A.F.C. players
Rochdale A.F.C. players
Wigan Athletic F.C. players